Hadennia jutalis is a moth of the family Noctuidae first described by Francis Walker in 1859. It is found in India, Sri Lanka, Thailand, Malaysia, Laos, Vietnam, Myanmar and the Andaman Islands.

References

Moths of Asia
Moths described in 1859
Herminiinae